Sarawut Treephan (Thai  สระราวุฒิ ตรีพันธ์) is a Thai former footballer and Thai football coach. He was most recently the manager of Thai League 3 club Songkhla.

Managerial statistics

 A win or loss by penalty shoot-out is counted as a draw.

Honours

Player

International

Thailand U 23
  Sea Games Gold medal (1) : 2001

Club

Bangkok Christian College F.C.
  Thai Division 1 League Winners (1) ; 2001

Chula United
  Thai Division 2 League Winners (1) ; 2006

Manager
Songkhla
Thai League 3 Southern Region
  Winners : 2022–23

Individual
Thai League 1 Coach of the Month (1): October 2020

References

1979 births
Living people
Sarawut Treephan
Sarawut Treephan
Footballers at the 2002 Asian Games
Sarawut Treephan
Southeast Asian Games medalists in football
Association football fullbacks
Competitors at the 2001 Southeast Asian Games
Sarawut Treephan
Sarawut Treephan
Sarawut Treephan
Sarawut Treephan